Phleum (timothy) is a genus of annual and perennial plants in the grass family. The genus is native to Europe, Asia and north Africa, with one species (P. alpinum) also in North and South America.

They are tufted grasses growing to 20–150 cm tall, with cylindrical, spike-like panicles containing many densely packed spikelets.

 Species

 formerly included
numerous species now considered better suited to other genera: Aegilops Alopecurus Beckmannia Crypsis Cynodon Cynosurus Digitaria Elytrophorus Ischaemum Mnesithea Muhlenbergia Pennisetum Pentameris Phalaris Polypogon Polytrias Sesleria Tribolium

Cultivation and uses
Several species are important for cattle feed and as hay for horses and other domestic animals.

References

Pooideae
Poaceae genera
Taxa named by Carl Linnaeus